This gallery of flags of the autonomous communities of Spain shows the distinctive flags of the 17 autonomous communities (constitutionally they are the nationalities and regions in which Spain is territorially organized), plus the autonomous cities of Ceuta and Melilla.

Autonomies

Autonomous communities

See also
 Autonomous communities of Spain
 Anthems of the autonomous communities of Spain
 Coats of arms of the autonomous communities of Spain

 
Spain geography-related lists
 Flags
Spanish culture
Spain
Spain